USA-214, also known as Advanced Extremely High Frequency-1 or AEHF-1, is a military communications satellite operated by the United States Air Force. It is the first of six satellites to be launched as part of the Advanced Extremely High Frequency program, which will replace the earlier Milstar system.

Satellite description 
The USA-214 satellite was constructed by Lockheed Martin Space, and is based on the A2100 satellite bus. It will be used to provide super high frequency (SHF) and extremely high frequency (EHF) communications for the United States Armed Forces, as well as those of the United Kingdom, the Netherlands, and Canada.

Launch 

Though initially scheduled for launch on 30 July 2010, delays with the launch vehicle pushed flight back to 10 August 2010, and finally to 14 August 2010.

USA-214 was launched by United Launch Alliance, aboard an Atlas V 531 flying from Space Launch Complex-41 (SLC-41) at the Cape Canaveral Air Force Station (CCAFS).

Anomaly 
The satellite was intended to maneuver from the transfer orbit into which it was launched to its operational geosynchronous orbit by means of a liquid apogee engine (LAE) and several 
Hall-effect thrusters, a process which normally takes 105 days. However, the satellite's Liquid Apogee Engine malfunctioned shortly after ignition on both its first burn on 15 August 2010 and a second attempt on 17 August 2010, and it was declared inoperable.

To solve the problem, the perigee altitude was raised to  using twelve firings of the smaller Reaction Engine Assembly thrusters, originally intended for attitude control during LAE maneuvers. From this altitude, the solar arrays were deployed and the orbit was raised toward the operational orbit over the course of nine months using the 0.27 Newton Hall effect thruster, a form of electric propulsion which is highly efficient, but produces very low thrust and is therefore very slow.

The problem with the liquid apogee engine was later blamed on a piece of cloth accidentally left in a fuel line leading up to the engine while the line was taken apart for repair during the manufacture of the satellite. The cloth was likely placed in the line to prevent impurities from entering the fuel line and did not get removed when the line was put back together.

See also 

 2010 in spaceflight

References 

Spacecraft launched in 2010
USA satellites